Hans G. Conrad (*11 June 1926 in Remetschwil, Switzerland as Johann Gerold Konrad; † 26 December 2003 in Cologne, Germany) was a photographer and graphic designer in the 20th century.

Life and works 

Hans G. Conrad grew up in modest circumstances and graduated from the so-called Werkschule of Brown, Boveri & Cie. in Baden, Switzerland. In the late 1940s he met the artist, architect, designer and publicist Max Bill in Zurich, Switzerland. Conrad worked for Bill, who, at that time, had been commissioned to design the Swiss Pavilion for the Milan Triennial IX in 1951. At that time, Conrad was also working for the Swiss architect and designer Alfred Roth (not to be confused with the German politician). Later, between 1952 and 1954, Conrad designed promotional advertising for the German-American furniture manufacturer Knoll International belonging to Florence Knoll and Hans Knoll.

By way of Max Bill, who was one of the co-founders of the Ulm School of Design (Hochschule für Gestaltung, HfG) alongside Otl Aicher and Inge Scholl, Conrad relocated to Ulm during the HfG's founding period, most likely on 1 December 1952. He was the first student at the HfG: his student ID was valid from 1 January 1953, although classes did not officially start until 3 August 1953.

At first he studied product design and then visual communication. Conrad met his first wife, Eva-Maria Koch, who was also a student at the HfG, in Ulm. Otl Aicher and Conrad developed an exhibition system for the electrical appliance manufacturer Max Braun (company) that was used for the first time at the Deutsche Rundfunk- Phono- und Fernsehen Ausstellung (German Broadcasting, Phonograph and Television Exhibition) in Düsseldorf in 1955. In 1956, the combined phonograph-radio device Phonosuper Braun SK 4, later known as the Schneewittchensarg (Snow White's Casket), which is one of the most influential design developments of the 20th century (design: Hans Gugelot, Dieter Rams and Otl Aicher), was introduced in this design setting. He designed an exhibition bus for Braun as a final project, which was, however, never realized.

Conrad worked as the head of trade fair and exhibition design at Braun from 1958 until 1962. Thereafter, he took over as head of worldwide advertising for Lufthansa. He engaged Otl Aicher and his design group E5 of the HfG in Ulm to develop a visual corporate design concept for Lufthansa. Otl Aicher's concept from 1962 is seen today as a milestone for the development of rationally derived corporate design concepts and is, in its most substantial and essential elements, still used today.

Hans G. Conrad was a member of the committee for visual design of the Olympic Games in Munich between 1969 and 1972. (Chairman: Anton Stankowski). Otl Aicher led the department XI (visual design).

Conrad became a member of the editorial staff of the business magazine "Capital" in 1970 (position comparable to today's Creative Director). Adolf Theobald was the publisher of the magazine and Ferdinand Simoneit its editor in chief until 1974 at which time Johannes Gross took over the position. The magazine developed into one of the most influential and predominant in Germany's media under his leadership.

In 1989 Conrad left "Capital". In October 1992 he suffered a stroke. He died on 26 December 2003 in a nursing home in Cologne-Rodenkirchen.

References 

 ADC Art Director's Club for Germany Yearbook, 1966, page 140.
 Magazine "Werbeform", No. 2, Scherpe Publishers, Krefeld (Germany) 1958.
 Flatternde Hosen. News magazine "Der Spiegel", No. 33, 8 August 1966, In: Der Spiegel. 33/1966.
 Magazine "ulm", No. 1, 1958.
 Magazine "ulm", No. 2, 1958.
 Magazine "ulm", No. 8/9, 1963.
 Magazine "ulm", No. 10/11, 1964.
 Magazine "ulm", No. 21, 1968.
 Magazine "Ulmer Monatsspiegel", No. 81/1956.

Further reading 
 Jörg Crone: Die visuelle Kommunikation der Gesinnung. Zu den grafischen Arbeiten von Otl Aicher und der Entwicklungsgruppe 5 für die Deutsche Lufthansa 1962. Diss phil. Freiburg i.Br. 1998.
 Volker Fischer (Ed.): The Wings of the crane. 50 years of Lufthansa design. Axel Menges Publishers, Stuttgart/London 2005, .
 Hans Höger (Ed.): design is a journey. Positionen zu Design, Werbung und Unternehmenskultur. Springer Publishers, Berlin/Heidelberg 1997, pages 44–57.
 Sophie Lovell: Dieter Rams: As Little Design as Possible. Phaidon Publishers, London 2011, .
 Hartmut Jatzke-Wigand, Jo Klatt (Eds.): The Development of the Braun Design. Magazine Design + Design (Hamburg), December 2011, .
 Eva Moser: otl aicher, gestalter. Hatje Cantz Publishers, Ostfildern 2011, .
 Jens Müller, Karen Weiland (Eds.): Lufthansa + Graphic Design. Visual History of an Airline. Lars Müller Publishers, Zurich 2011, .
 René Spitz: The View Behind the Foreground. The Political History of the Ulm School of Design. Axel Menges Publishers, Stuttgart/London 2002, .
 René Spitz: Ulm According to Conrad. Published in: Magazine form (Basel), No. 239/2011, pages 38–45.
 René Spitz: HfG Ulm: Concise History of the Ulm School of Design/Kurze Geschichte der Hochschule für Gestaltung. A5, Vol. 06, ed. by Jens Müller.  Lars Müller Publishers, Zürich 2014, .
 Hans Wichmann: Mut zum Aufbruch. Erwin Braun 1921–1992. Prestel Publishers, Munich 1998, .

External links 
 Triennale di Milano
 Advertising for Knoll International 1954 
 Max Bill
 Hans G. Conrad's photos of the Ulm School of Design
 Archive of the Ulm School of Design 

Swiss photographers
Swiss graphic designers
1926 births
2003 deaths
People from Ulm